Plait may refer to:

 Plait, also called a braid, intertwined strands of, for example, textile or hair
 Plait, now called a pleat, a fold of fabric, used in clothing and upholstery
 Plait (gastropod), a fold in the columella of a gastropod mollusc
 Plaiting in basketry
 Phil Plait, American astronomer, skeptic and blogger